Temple Beth El of Borough Park, now known as Young Israel Beth El of Borough Park, is a historic synagogue at 4802 15th Avenue in Borough Park, Brooklyn, New York.

Buildings
Founded as Congregation Beth El of Borough Park in August, 1902, it erected a brick building in 1906, at 12th Avenue and 41st Street. A three-story building that currently houses the organization was built between 1920 and 1923. It has Moorish and Egyptian design influences. It was listed on the National Register of Historic Places in 2010.

Both buildings are still in use as synagogues. The older building is the oldest synagogue building in Borough Park, and has been used by several different congregations. In 2017, trustees of the current owner of the 12th Avenue structure, Congregation Anshe Lubavitch, sold the building to developers, sparking controversy and a civil court case with some of the other members.

In the 1980s, the Young Israel of Borough Park merged with Congregation Beth El. The combined organization, though having fewer worshippers than in the 1980s, still uses the 1920s building.

Leaders
Beth El historically had a distinguished list of officials, including:
 Rabbi Avroham Ever Hirshkowitz, 1906 though early 1920s (Founding Rabbi Congregation Beth El of Borough Park, 12th Ave and 41st St.)
 Rabbi Simon Glazer, rabbi in the mid-1920s
 Mordechai Hershman, cantor throughout the 1920s
 Berele Chagy, cantor 1940s and early 1950s
 Moshe Koussevitzky, cantor from 1952 to 1966
 Paul Zim (Zimelman), cantor from 1966 to 1968
 Moshe Stern, cantor from 1968 to 1977

More recent names include:
 Rabbi Gedalia Dov Schwartz, rabbi from 1969 to 1987
 Rabbi Israel Schorr, rabbi from 1938 to 2000
 Rabbi Moshe Snow, rabbi, 2000 to present
 Benzion Miller, cantor, 1981 to present

Young Israel
The Young Israel of Boro Park was established well before World War II. One of its early rabbis was Rabbi Samuel Mirsky.

In the 1980s it merged with Congregation Beth El of Borough Park, which was founded in August, 1902.

Beth-El was and still is known for its famous cantors.

Young Israel's present rabbi previously served as youth leader; the Boro Park branch was known early on for its youth group.

References

External links

 

Borough Park, Brooklyn
Egyptian Revival architecture in the United States
Moorish Revival architecture in New York City
Synagogues in Brooklyn
Properties of religious function on the National Register of Historic Places in Brooklyn
Synagogues completed in 1923
Synagogues on the National Register of Historic Places in New York City
Moorish Revival synagogues
Egyptian Revival synagogues
National Council of Young Israel